Hawthornthwaite Fell is one of the larger hills in the Forest of Bowland in Lancashire, England, occupying a north-facing position on the south-western range, close to Bleasdale and Fair Snape Fell. The only path to the summit comes over the hills from the south. Most of the hill is on the Duke of Westminster's land. The summit is boggy and flanked to the north by steep heather slopes. Grouse are farmed in the area and hen harriers can be seen frequently. The trig point and the remains of its foundations are no longer upright, lying horizontally pointing westward. Hawthornthwaite Fell marks the extreme western limit of the West Riding of the Historic County of York.

See also
Langden Brook, sourced from the fell

References

Hills of the Forest of Bowland
Mountains and hills of Lancashire
Geography of the City of Lancaster
Geography of Ribble Valley